Chooka may refer to:

Chooka Talesh F.C., Iranian football club based in Talesh, Iran
Chooka Parker, a contestant musician in season 5 of Australia's Got Talent